The Apurímac River (from Quechua apu 'divinity' and rimaq 'oracle, talker') rises from glacial meltwater of the ridge of the Mismi, a  mountain in the Arequipa Province in the south-western mountain ranges of Peru,  from the village Caylloma, and less than  from the Pacific coast. It flows generally northwest past Cusco in narrow gorges with depths of up to 3,000 m, twice as deep as the Grand Canyon, its course interrupted by falls and rapids. Of the six attempts so far to travel the Apurímac in its full length, only two have been successful.

In the 13th century, the Inca constructed a bridge over this river which gave them access to the west. Erected around 1350, it was still in use in 1864, and dilapidated but still hanging in 1890. It was the basis for the titular bridge in Thornton Wilder's 1927 novel The Bridge of San Luis Rey. One such bridge, Queshuachaca, is reassembled on an annual basis.

See also
 Aqumayu
 Choquequirao
 Hatun Wayq'u
 Majes-Siguas
 Source of the Amazon River
 Arequipa Province

References

Further reading
 

Tributaries of the Ucayali River
Rivers of Peru
Rivers of Cusco Region
Rivers of Apurímac Region